Boydia is a genus of moths of the family Xyloryctidae.

Species
 Boydia criniferella Newman, 1856
 Boydia stenadelpha (Lower, 1905)

References

Xyloryctidae
Xyloryctidae genera